Rembia is a state constituency in Malacca, Malaysia, that has been represented in the Melaka State Legislative Assembly.

The state constituency was first contested in 1995 and is mandated to return a single Assemblyman to the Melaka State Legislative Assembly under the first-past-the-post voting system. , the State Assemblyman for Rembia is Muhammad Jailani Khamis from United Malays National Organisation (UMNO), formerly Parti Keadilan Rakyat (PKR), which is part of the state's ruling coalition, Barisan Nasional (BN).

Definition 
The Rembia constituency contains the polling districts of Pekan Alor Gajah, Kelemak, Jelatang, Kampung Tebat, Sungai Petai, Pekan Rembia and Jeram.

Demographics

History

Polling districts
According to the gazette issued on 31 October 2022, the Rembia constituency has a total of 7 polling districts.

Representation history

Election results
The electoral results for the Rembia state constituency in 2004, 2008, 2013, 2018 and 2021 are as follows.

References

Malacca state constituencies